Carol Jenkins Barnett (September 30, 1956 – December 7, 2021) was an American philanthropist and businesswoman, the daughter of George W. Jenkins, the founder of Publix Super Markets. Jenkins Barnett served as president of Publix Super Markets Charities and as a member of the board of directors of Publix Super Markets. She had been included in a Forbes list of The World's Billionaires every year from 2008 on.

Early life
Carol Jenkins was the daughter of Anne MacGregor and George W. Jenkins. Jenkins Barnett is one of six children: Howard, David, Julie, Nancy and Kenneth. Barnett attended Emory University but later transferred to Florida Southern College in Lakeland, Florida.

Carol Barnett's father, George W. Jenkins, founded Publix Super Markets. Carol was born in 1956 when Publix was in its heyday. Carol and her five siblings worked at Publix beginning at the age of sixteen. She recalled the time: "The way I grew up, everything was about Publix. We'd go to store openings. I remember attending the 100th store opening when I was eight. I was there for the glory years."

Business career

Board of directors
In 1983, Jenkins Barnett joined the Publix Board of Directors and served in that role until 2016. During her time at Publix, the company grew into the largest supermarket chain in Florida, expanded into five other states, and recorded $32.5 billion in sales in 2015.

Publix Charities
Publix Super Markets Charities strives to provide the communities it serves with funding for housing with Habitat for Humanity. The charity also supports other causes such as food assistance, education, and youth programs. Between 1991 and 2016, Jenkins Barnett served as president of Publix Super Market Charities. Jenkins Barnett helped lead the organization to donate $25 million to nonprofit organizations each year. She helped lead the organization to donate over 10 million dollars to Habitat for Humanity.

Philanthropy

In 2011, Florida Southern College announced an undisclosed contribution from Jenkins Barnett in honor of her husband, Barney Barnett, a graduate of Florida Southern. The funds were used to establish the Barney Barnett School of Business and Free Enterprise. The Barnetts also gave a reported 10 million dollars to Florida Southern College to establish the Barnett Residential Life Center that was designed by Robert A. M. Stern.

In 2012, the Barnetts were the primary donors in a funding drive for the construction of a $5.5 million, 18-classroom learning facility at All Saints' Academy in Winter Haven, Florida. They gave $1 million to help launch the Carol J. and Barney Barnett Learning Center, which opened in 2014 at the Florida Aquarium in Tampa. To promote environmental conservation, the Barnetts donated $3 million to Mote Marine Laboratory and Aquarium in Sarasota, Florida in 2015. The Barnetts have donated millions of dollars to the United Way.

In 2016, the Lakeland Regional Health Foundation received a donation from the Barnett family in honor of Carol Jenkins Barnett for the Pavilion for Women and Children at the Lakeland Regional Health Medical Center Campus. The gift was the largest donation received to date by the Foundation. The new building was named the Carol Jenkins Barnett Pavilion for Women and Children.

Also in 2016, the Barnetts gave $800,000 to the Drug Free Florida Committee, an organization leading opposition to Amendment 2 to the Constitution of the State of Florida, which legalized marijuana for medical use in Florida.

Personal life and death
Barnett had two sons with her husband, Barney Barnett.

In 2016, Barnett was diagnosed with early-onset Alzheimer's disease. She died from complications of the disease on December 7, 2021, at age 65.

Awards and recognition
In 2004, Barnett was presented with the Florida Arts Recognition Award by the Secretary of State of Florida to honor people who support art and culture in Florida. She contributed to many Florida arts organizations, including the Polk Museum of Art, Lakeland Symphony Orchestra and Straz Center for the Performing Arts.

In 2015, Barnett received the Women in Philanthropy award, a national honor bestowed by the United Way Women's Leadership Council for her work developing a number of early childhood initiatives, including the ReadingPals literacy program that spread throughout Florida. In 2016, Jenkins Barnett was inducted into the Florida Women's Hall of Fame.

In 2017, Barnett received the Chiles Advocacy Award, Florida's highest honor for serving its children. The Barbara Bush Foundation for Family Literacy presented Barnett with its “Champion for Literacy” award. The Barnetts announced plans to introduce the largest park in Lakeland, Florida.  Jenkins Barnett has served on the steering committee for The Children's Movement of Florida.

Barnett was named a Notable Member of the Association of Junior Leagues International, an honor given to only 18 women since the association's founding in 1901.

References

External links
2016 Florida Women's Hall of Fame Inductee Carol Jenkins Barnett of Lakeland via YouTube
United Way of Miami-Dade ReadingPals: Carol and Barney Barnett via YouTube

1956 births
2021 deaths
20th-century American businesspeople
20th-century American businesswomen
20th-century American philanthropists
21st-century American businesspeople
21st-century American businesswomen
21st-century American philanthropists
American billionaires
American businesspeople in retailing
American grocers
American women philanthropists
Businesspeople from Florida
Deaths from Alzheimer's disease
Emory University alumni
Florida Southern College alumni
Deaths from dementia in Florida
People from Lakeland, Florida
Philanthropists from Florida
20th-century women philanthropists
21st-century women philanthropists
Florida Women's Hall of Fame Inductees